Feng Zicai (1818–1903)  was a general in the Imperial Army during the Qing dynasty. He was originally a bandit from Qinzhou, Guangxi, China.

The Taiping Rebellion
In 1856, Feng, a lieutenant colonel, commanded a regiment stationed in northern Jiangsu during the Taiping Rebellion. He defeated rebel forces many times on their march across the Yangtze River toward the north and was promoted to lieutenant general in 1864. The war ended in 1871.

In 1867, he established his base of command in Nanning where he worked to fight bandits, rebels, the Hmong and other groups threatening the Qing Empire in south China and northern Vietnam.

Sino-French War

During the Sino-French War (August 1884 to April 1885) Feng was placed in command of a chiefly Zhuang armed force in South China, composed mainly of local peasantry and some of Feng's retired imperial troops.  On 23 February 1885 the misdeployment of Feng's troops too far from the battlefield was a major factor in the defeat of China's Kwangsi Army in the Battle of Đồng Đăng.  Feng atoned for his incompetence exactly one month later.  On 23 and 24 March 1885 Feng's forces were present at the Battle of Bang Bo, in which Francois de Negrier's 2nd Brigade was defeated at Zhennanguan on the Kwangsi-Tonkin border.  The Chinese had heavily fortified their position, and although the French captured a number of Chinese outworks on 23 March, their attacks on 24 March failed to make any headway.  Eventually the French were counterattacked and forced to retreat with heavy casualties.

Feng Zicai's troops, stationed on the Chinese right wing around the village of Bang Bo, played an important role in the battle, defeating an assault by the French 111th Line Battalion on a position known as 'the long trench'.  Feng is said to have encouraged his troops with the words 'You should die rather than bear to see a French army invading Chinese soil!' (寧死不忍見法軍侵入中國境內).  He is also said to have personally led the Chinese counterattack against the 111th Battalion. The Chinese had been beaten with ease by the French during the Lang Son Campaign of February 1885, and Chinese sources attest to the poor morale of the Chinese army at Bang Bo.  Feng Zicai is known to have issued orders that any man who left his post would be executed on the spot, and several dozen Chinese soldiers who fled when the French approached the long trench were immediately shot.

Feng's defiant words to his troops at Bang Bo are sculpted on a giant stone on Wuzhi Mountain, the highest mountain in Hainan.

Film portrayal
The story of Feng Zicai and the victory of the Chinese troops was made into the 2017 film The War of Loong.

See also
Draft History of Qing
Zhang Guoliang

References

1818 births
1903 deaths
Generals from Guangxi
People from Bobai
People from Qinzhou
People of the Sino-French War
People of the Taiping Rebellion
Qing dynasty tidus